Bahman (also known as Bakhman and Behmān) is a village in Ijrud-e Pain Rural District, Halab District, Ijrud County, Zanjan Province, Iran. At the 2006 census, its population was 128, in 33 families.

References 

Populated places in Ijrud County